Reinhold Hilbers (born 25 July 1964 in Lingen) is a German businessman and politician of the Christian Democratic Union (CDU). He has been a member of the Landtag of Lower Saxony since March 2003. Since November 2017, he has been serving as State Minister of Finance in the government of Minister-President Stephan Weil.

Early life and career
After training in the wholesale and export business, he undertook military service in the Bundeswehr. Then, he studied economics at the Osnabrück University of Applied Sciences. Between 1993 and 1999, he worked at a local bank. From 1999 he served as managing director of Lebenshilfe Nordhorn GmbH.

Political career
Hilbers became a member of the CDU in 1988. At present he is chairman of the CDU district of Grafschaft Bentheim.

Since the 2003 state elections, Hilbers has been a member of the State Parliament of Lower Saxony. He was elected with 72.2% of the votes to represent his constituency in parliament. In the 2008 state elections, he obtained 55.6% of the votes. From 2013 until 2017, he served as deputy chairman of the CDU parliamentary group.

In 2017, Bernd Althusmann included Hilbers in his shadow cabinet for the Christian Democrats’ campaign to unseat incumbent Minister-President Stephan Weil; during the campaign, he was in charge of social policy issues. Hilbers eventually became State Minister of Finance. In this capacity, he is one of the state's representatives at the Bundesrat, where he serves on the Finance Committee.

Hilbers was nominated by his party as delegate to the Federal Convention for the purpose of electing the President of Germany in 2022.

Other activities

Regulatory agencies
 Stability Council, Ex-Officio Member

Corporate boards
 Deutsche Messe AG, Member of the Advisory Board
 Bentheimer Eisenbahn AG, Chairman of the supervisory board (since 2017)
 KfW, Member of the Board of Supervisory Directors
 Norddeutsche Landesbank (NORD/LB), Ex-Officio Chairman of the supervisory board (since 2017), previously Member of the Advisory Board
 Salzgitter AG, Ex-Officio Member of the Supervisory Board

Non-profit organizations
 Max Planck Society, Member of the Senate

References

External links

 Christlich Demokratische Union Deutschlands web site

1964 births
Living people
People from Lingen
Christian Democratic Union of Germany politicians
Businesspeople from Lower Saxony
Members of the Landtag of Lower Saxony
Ministers of the Lower Saxony State Government